The Vanuatu national netball team is the national netball team of Vanuatu. The current Vanuatu Lava members are below.

The Vanuatu Netball Association was formed in November, 1986 in Port Vila. The team colours are red and yellow.

Current squad
Vanuatu Team at the 2015 Pacific Games:
Nelline Buetari
Lilian Willie
Roselyne Willy
Royline Charlie
Aileen Huri
Vanessa Laloyer
Pauline Malanga
Monua Nalisa
Kathy Sogari
Stephany Tarileo
Charlotte Temakon

Previous Teams

Competitive history

References

External links

National netball teams of Oceania
Netball
Netball in Vanuatu